Bika ambon or golden cake or golden kuih bingka in Singapore, is an Indonesian dessert, made from ingredients such as tapioca flour, eggs, sugar, yeast and coconut milk. Bika ambon is generally sold in pandan and banana flavor, but today it is also available in other flavors like durian, cheese and chocolate. 

This cake is a further development of kue bingka, a famous traditional cake in the eastern parts of Indonesia. 

The cake is notable for its sponge-like holes, which was formed by yeast in the cake dough that creates bubbles. This holes gives it a unique spongy texture when it is baked. Its close analogue probably is the Malay sponge cake, due to similar spongy holes, but the moists and texture is actually slightly different. 

Although the name contains the word "Ambon", the name of an island and its largest city, Bika ambon is widely known as the specialty cake of Medan in North Sumatra and is often brought as a gift by those who visited the city. The origins of bika ambon are not known; however, there is some speculation that they came to Medan through Ambonese traders, where the locals took a liking to it. Mojopahit Street, Medan Petisah is the most famous sales region of bika ambon in Medan, North Sumatra. There are at least 40 stores that sell this kind of cake.

Recently, bika ambon has become popular around Central Java, thanks to a few retail shops that sell various Indonesian traditional cakes.

See also

 Kue 
 White sugar sponge cake
 Bánh bò

References

Kue